"This Is Me Trying" (stylized in all lowercase) is a song by American singer-songwriter Taylor Swift. It is the ninth track on her eighth studio album Folklore (2020), which was released on July 24, 2020, by Republic Records. "This Is Me Trying" was written by Swift and Jack Antonoff and produced by the latter two along with Joe Alwyn. It is an orchestral pop and dream pop song supported by an organ, slow-paced beats, and horns.

The song is written "from three different characters' perspectives"; Swift conveyed the emotions felt in 2016 and 2017. The narrator of "This Is Me Trying" embraces the perspective of "the rejected party to devastating effect". Swift tries to hide as the narrator of the track, as she accepts someone's else point of view of her. Swift, in her 2020 concert documentary Folklore: The Long Pond Studio Sessions, said that the song also touches on alcoholism.

Critics lauded the song's production and lyrics, with some praising Swift's vocal performance. In the United States, "This Is Me Trying" peaked at number 39 on the  Billboard Hot 100 and nine on the Billboard Hot Rock & Alternative Songs. The song entered the top 40 on singles charts of Australia, Canada, and Singapore. "This is Me Trying" was used in a commercial celebrating American gymnast Simone Biles' return to the 2020 Summer Olympics after she withdrew from several events due to medical issues. It was performed on the Eras Tour (2023) as the surprise song for the second show in Glendale, Arizona.

Background and production
Taylor Swift and producer Jack Antonoff had written and produced songs for Swift's previous studio albums 1989 (2014), Reputation (2017), and Lover (2019). They collaborated again on Folklore, which Swift surprise-released amid the COVID-19 pandemic in 2020. Folklore was released on July 24, 2020, through Republic Records. Swift wrote or co-wrote all songs on the album, and along with Antonoff produced six, including "This Is Me Trying". Swift wrote the lyrics "from three different characters' perspectives"; she conveyed the emotions felt in 2016 and 2017, "I just felt like I was worth absolutely nothing." The first verse regards a character who is in a life crisis and failing in a relationship, while the second verse is about one who "has a lot of potential, but has feels they have lost in life", falling into alcohol addiction and has "issues with struggling every day". On the third verse, Swift wondered how the song would turn out if it was produced by the National.

"This Is Me Trying" also features production from English actor Joe Alwyn. The song was recorded at Kitty Committee Studio in Beverly Hills by Laura Sisk and Antonoff. The latter also played bass, electric guitar, drums, organ, and keyboard, which were recorded at Conway Recording Studios in Los Angeles and Electric Lady Studios in New York. Evan Smith played the saxophone and additional keyboard, both instruments were recorded at Pleasure Hill Recording in Portland. Bobby Hawk and Lorenzo Wolf were in charge of the strings that were recorded at Restoration Sound in New York. John Rooney and Jon Sher worked as assistant engineers. Serban Ghenea mixed "This Is Me Trying" at MixStar Studios in Virginia Beach, with John Hanes serving as the mix engineer. It was mastered by Randy Merrill at Sterling Sound in New York.

Composition
"This is Me Trying" was written from multiple perspectives. The song was inspired by her state of mind in 2016–2017 when she "felt like [she] was worth absolutely nothing". It also contains themes of addiction and existential crisis. According to Swift, people around her were not aware of her trying "not to fall into old patterns". In the documentary concert film Folklore: The Long Pond Studio Sessions (2020), Swift said that the song also touches on alcoholism. The lyrics also address "where her life is", noticed in the verse, "I got wasted like all my potential". The song documents the accountability and regret of someone who admits feeling that they are not enough. However, there are "feelings of hope and growth."

The narrator of "This Is Me Trying" embraces the perspective of "the rejected party to devastating effect". Swift tries to hide as the narrator of the track, as she gives "credence to the other person's view of her". She transmits the idea that she has a habit of needing "the last word, in public and private" and that has been her downfall. "This Is Me Trying" is an orchestral pop and dream pop song. Its instrumentation features a "yawning" organ, "subtle" horns, percussions, strings, and a saxophone. The track was written in the key of A major and has a moderately fast tempo of 136 beats per minute. Swift's vocal range spans between D3 to C5. "This Is Me Trying" evolves into a "wracked orchestral grandeur". The Guardian Laura Snapes wrote the song "[sounded] more unsettling still for how Swift's voice, processed at a ghostly, vast remove, seems to encompass the whole song with her desperation".

Critical reception
"This Is Me Trying" received positive reviews from most music critics. Alexandrea Lang from the Dallas Observer named "This Is Me Trying" as one of the "most profound and underrated" songs on Folklore, praising Swift's "gorgeous, breathy vocals" and the "flawless" capture of emotions of someone struggling with motivation and mental illness. Jonathan Keefe from Slant Magazine affirmed that the track "still demonstrates Swift's masterful grasp of song structure". Clash Lucy Harbron lauded Swift's "penchant for blending the last remnants of her country roots with a more modern edge". Rolling Stone critic Rob Sheffield said that the track is "the disturbingly witty tale of someone pouring her heart out, to keep herself from pouring more whiskey." Regarding the song's metaphor set around curve and sphere, Sheffield commented: "Taylor could have invented geometry, but Euclid couldn't have written this song."

Rob Harvilla of The Ringer called the song one of the album's "most luscious and intense songs", soaked in regret, failure and booze, "as luminous as it is dolorous". He praised Swift's "sharp and specific" writing and the "gauzy lusciousness" of Antonoff's production. New Statesman critic Anna Leszkiewicz defined "This Is Me Trying" as an "expansive, atmospheric portrait" of someone opting vulnerability over "defense mechanisms" in a relationship. Despite viewing the song less favorably, Eric Mason, writing for Slant Magazine, praised Swift's vulnerability in the song, stating that she was "mining both her vulnerability and her ability to do harm" on the track.

"This Is Me Trying" was featured on a list of the best songs of 2020 by Teen Vogue. In Clash list ranking the writer's 15 favorite Swift songs, Lucy Harbron remarked on the singer's vocals: "It's one of the first times her voice ever sounded this mature and jagged as the bridge seems to bite at your ears". In Vulture list ranking all songs in Swift's discography, Jones wrote about "This Is Me Trying": "The climax sneaks up on you like a moment of clarity." Sheffield picked it among the best 20 songs of Swift's discography, "The easiest Folklore song to underrate, because it seems so deceptively straight-ahead."

Commercial performance 
Upon the release of Folklore, "This Is Me Trying" debuted on various singles charts. In the United States, the song entered at number 39 on the Billboard Hot 100 chart dated August 8, 2020. The song simultaneously debuted and peaked at number nine on Billboard'''s Hot Rock & Alternative Songs chart, where it stayed for 14 weeks. "This Is Me Trying" peaked within the top 40 on singles charts of Australia, Canada, and Singapore. On the Rolling Stone Top 100, the song peaked at number 13 in July 2020.

 Usage in media 
"This is Me Trying" was used in a promotional video released in August 2021 celebrating American gymnast Simone Biles' return to the 2020 Summer Olympics after she withdrew from several events due to medical issues. The song was featured in the seventh episode of the first season of American television series Gossip Girl'' (2021).

Credits and personnel
Credits are adapted from the album's liner notes.

 Taylor Swift – vocals, songwriting, production
 Jack Antonoff – production, songwriting, live drums, percussion, programming, keyboards, bass, background vocals, organ, recording
 Joe Alwyn – production
 Evan Smith – saxophones, keyboards
 Bobby Hawk – strings
 Lorenzo Wolf – strings

 Laura Sisk – recording
 John Rooney – assistant engineering
 Jon Sher – assistant engineering
 Serban Ghenea – mixing
 John Hanes – mix engineering
 Randy Merrill – mastering

Charts

Certifications

Note

References

2020 songs
Song recordings produced by Jack Antonoff
Song recordings produced by Taylor Swift
Songs written by Jack Antonoff
Songs written by Taylor Swift
Taylor Swift songs
Songs about alcohol
Dream pop songs
Song recordings produced by Joe Alwyn